France's Alizé Cornet won the title, defeating Mariana Duque Marino in the final, 4-6, 6–1, 6–0.

Agnieszka Radwańska was the defending champion, but chose to participate in the main draw instead.

Seeds

Draw

Finals

Top half

Section 1

Section 2

Bottom half

Section 3

Section 4

External links
 Draw

Girls' Singles
French Open, 2007 Girls' Singles